Myrmoderus is a genus of passerine birds in the family Thamnophilidae.

The genus contains five species:
 Ferruginous-backed antbird (Myrmoderus ferrugineus)
 Cordillera Azul antbird (Myrmoderus eowilsoni)
 Scalloped antbird (Myrmoderus ruficauda)
 White-bibbed antbird (Myrmoderus loricatus)
 Squamate antbird (Myrmoderus squamosus)

The Cordillera Azul antbird was first described in 2018. The other four species were formerly included in the genus Myrmeciza. A molecular phylogenetic study published in 2013 found that Myrmeciza, as then defined, was polyphyletic. In the resulting rearrangement to create monophyletic genera four species were moved to the resurrected genus Myrmoderus. The genus had originally been erected in 1909 by the American ornithologist Robert Ridgway with the white-bibbed antbird as the type species.

References

 
Taxa named by Robert Ridgway